{{Infobox football club
| clubname   = UNAM (youth system)
| image      = File:Club Universidad Nacional.png
| image_size = 200px
| nickname   = PumasUniversidad (University)Universitarios (Collegiates)| fullname   = 
| current    = 
| founded    = 
| ground     = CanteraCoyoacán, Mexico City, Mexico 
| capacity   = 2,000
| owner      = UNAM
| chairman   = Leopoldo Silva Gutiérrez
| manager =  Juan Ramírez Perales (U-20) Miguel Carreón (U-18)  Alejandro Pérez Macías (U-16) Alejandro Estrada (U-14)
| league = Liga MX U-20Liga MX U-18Liga MX U-16Liga MX U-14
| season = Apertura 2022
| position =  U-20: WinnersU-18: Quarter-finalsU-16: 10thU-14: Quarter-finals
|pattern_la1      = _pumas2223h
|pattern_b1       = _pumas2223h
|pattern_ra1      = _pumas2223h
|pattern_sh1      = _pumas2223h
|pattern_so1      = _pumas2223h
|leftarm1         = FFFFFF
|body1            = FFFFFF
|rightarm1        = FFFFFF
|shorts1          = FFFFFF
|socks1           = FFFFFF
|pattern_la2      = _pumas2223a
|pattern_b2       = _pumas2223a
|pattern_ra2      = _pumas2223a
|pattern_sh2      = _pumas2223a
|pattern_so2      = _pumas1314t
|leftarm2         = 000040
|body2            = 000040
|rightarm2        = 000034
|shorts2          = 000049
|socks2           = 000021
|pattern_la3      =
|pattern_b3       = 
|pattern_ra3      = 
|pattern_sh3      = 
|pattern_so3      = 
|leftarm3         = 
|body3            = 
|rightarm3        = 
|shorts3          = 
|socks3           = 
|}}

The Cantera (quarry'') of Mexican professional football club UNAM is the organisation's youth academy, developing players from childhood through to the integration of the best prospects into the adult teams.

The academy is based at the club training complex, Cantera, which is often the name used informally to refer to the system itself.

Current U-20 roster

Current U-18 roster

Current U-16 roster

Notable youth system graduates 

  Jorge Campos
  Miguel España
  Luis Flores
  Luis García
  Manuel Negrete
  Hugo Sánchez
  Claudio Suárez

References

External links 

 Universidad Nacional official website
 UNAM official website

Club Universidad Nacional
Mexican reserve football clubs
Football clubs in Mexico City